The 1972–73 Northern Rugby Football League season was the 78th season of rugby league football played in England. It would also be the last season whereby the British championship was decided by a play-off system until Super League III in 1998. Dewsbury were crowned champions after defeating Leeds in the Final. The 1972–73 season was also punctuated by the 1972 Rugby League World Cup which was played in France in October and November. At the end of this season the league re-formed into two divisions. The top 16 in the championship would form Division 1 and the bottom 14 Division 2.

Rule changes
Number of tackles:
 The four-tackle rule was altered and a new limit of six tackles was introduced. The four-tackle rules had been blamed for making the game seem "disjointed".  A scrum was formed at the end of a completed set of the tackles.
Timekeeping:
 Timekeepers were given responsibility, rather than referees, for controlling time in matches. They signalled using a hooter siren system.

Season summary
Salford's David Watkins set the record for most goals (including drop goals) in a season with 221. Also, on 19 August 1972, Watkins started his record scoring streak which lasted until 25 April 1974. He totalled 929 points from 41 tries and 403 goals in 92 consecutive matches for one club.

1972-73 also saw the Wigan club celebrate its centenary, having been formed as Wigan F.C. on 21 November 1872. During the season they played a special Centenary Celebration match against an "Australians" side.
 Challenge Cup Winners: Featherstone Rovers (33-14 v Bradford Northern)
 Player's No.6 Trophy Winners: Leeds (12-7 v Salford at Fartown Ground, Huddersfield)
 BBC2 Floodlit Trophy Winners: Leigh (5-0 v Widnes)

Hunslet disbanded at the end of the season, reforming as New Hunslet for the 1973–74 season.

Salford beat Swinton 25–11 to win the Lancashire County Cup, and Leeds beat Dewsbury 36–9 to win the Yorkshire County Cup.

Championship

Final standings

Play-offs

Final
The 1973 Final was to be the last time a play-off system would be used to determine the British champions until 1998's Super League season. The match was played on 19 May 1973 at Bradford's Odsal Stadium between the previous season's champions, Leeds and first-time finalists, Dewsbury. Dewsbury had suffered a county cup record defeat 36–9 at the hands of Leeds in the Yorkshire County Cup Final earlier in the season. Also Leeds had finished 3rd on the ladder and Dewsbury 8th. However, Dewsbury opened up a 12–4 lead by the interval with tries by the hooker Mike Stephenson and Allan Agar and two goals and a drop-goal from the boot of centre Nigel Stephenson. Leeds captain Alan Hardisty was sent off for the first time in his career for a high tackle on John Bates.

A second try from Mike Stephenson on 44 minutes extended Dewsbury's lead and though Leeds hit back with tries by Graham Eccles, Phil Cookson and Les Dyl, it was not to be with Nigel Stephenson converting his own try to complete a resounding 22-13 success. Leading journalist Jack Winstanley wrote at the time: "Dewsbury's win sprung from a superb team effort that paid ample tribute to the coaching and inspiration of (coach) Tommy Smales. They bewildered a jaded Leeds outfit with a series of scissors moves and dummy passes that might have looked grossly over-elaborate had they not worked to such perfection." The Harry Sunderland Trophy for man-of-the-match went to Mike Stephenson. Greg Ashcroft, Jeff Grayshon and Alan Bates also played in the champion Dewsbury side.

Challenge Cup

The 1973 Challenge Cup Final was won by Featherstone Rovers who beat Bradford Northern 33–14 at Wembley Saturday 12 May 1973 before a crowd of 72,395. Featherstone Rovers' Great Britain scrum half-back, Steve Nash put in a man-of-the-match performance to win the Lance Todd Trophy. Cyril Kellett scored 8-conversions for Featherstone Rovers, the most in a Challenge Cup Final (equalled by Iestyn Harris in 1999).

League Cup

This was the second season of the League Cup, which was known as the Players No.6 Trophy for sponsorship reasons. Leeds won the trophy by beating Salford 12-7 in the final. The match was played at Fartown, Huddersfield. The attendance was 10,102 and receipts were £4563.

References

Sources
 All Time Records at rlhalloffame.org.uk
 1972-73 Rugby Football League season at wigan.rlfans.com 
 Pain of defeat serves Dewsbury well to prevent any repeat performance - article at yorkshirepost.co.uk
 Playing at Smales pace sank champions - article at yorkshirepost.co.uk

1972 in English rugby league
1973 in English rugby league
Northern Rugby Football League seasons